The Beverly Hillbillies is a 1993 American comedy film directed by Penelope Spheeris, written by Lawrence Konner and Mark Rosenthal, and starring Jim Varney, Diedrich Bader, Dabney Coleman, Erika Eleniak, Cloris Leachman, Rob Schneider, Lea Thompson and Lily Tomlin.

Based on the television series of the same name (which ran from 1962–71), the film features cameo appearances by Buddy Ebsen (the original Jed Clampett, in his final motion picture appearance, playing his other starring television role, Detective Barnaby Jones), Dolly Parton and Zsa Zsa Gabor. The film follows a poor hillbilly named Jed Clampett (Varney), who becomes a billionaire after inadvertently finding crude oil on his property while firing his gun.

Plot 
Jed Clampett (Jim Varney), a hillbilly of humble station from Arkansas, accidentally discovers oil on his land while shooting at a jackrabbit. Ozark Mountain Oil, interested in purchasing his land, offers him $1 billion for the property. Unsure of what to do, Jed consults his sister, Pearl Bodine (Linda Carlson), during a family dinner. Pearl suggests that a change of scenery for Jed's daughter, Elly May (Erika Eleniak), would be a good thing. Pearl and Jethro convince them to move to Beverly Hills California. Ozark Mountain Oil come by Jed's place to check to see if he has signed the contract. Having made up his mind and signed the contract, Jed and his daughter Elly, his mother-in-law, Daisy Moses (aka "Granny" (Cloris Leachman), and his nephew, Jethro (Diedrich Bader), Pearl's son, load up Jethro's old, dilapidated truck with their possessions and move to Beverly Hills, California, even though Granny is reluctant to come.

Milburn Drysdale (Dabney Coleman), the CEO of the Commerce Bank of Beverly Hills (where Jed's money is stored), sends out his secretary/assistant, Jane Hathaway (Lily Tomlin) to meet the Clampetts at their new estate that is next door to his. Jane calls the Beverly Hills Police after the Clampetts arrive, mistaking them for burglars. Upon learning of Jane's mistake at the police station, Drysdale briefly fires her. But seeing that Jed insists that he still wants her to watch over his affairs, Drysdale rehires her.

The Clampetts settle into their new surroundings. Drysdale and his wife, Margaret (Penny Fuller), push their reluctant son, Morgan Drysdale (Kevin Connolly), into befriending Elly May, to whom he eventually develops an attraction. Jane is also smitten by Jethro, who seems ignorant of her affections.

Jed requests Jane's assistance in helping him search for someone who will help turn Elly May into a lady and also wants to get married, so Miss Hathaway has to play matchmaker. Woodrow Tyler (Rob Schneider), a banker at Drysdale's bank, catches wind of this and contrives a scheme with his con artist girlfriend, Laura Jackson (Lea Thompson), to steal Jed's money by having her marry Jed. She poses as a French etiquette teacher, Laurette Voleur, and asks for work. 'Laurette' feigns romantic interest in Jed, which eventually leads to him proposing marriage to her.

Shortly before the wedding, Granny hears Laura and Woodrow talking about the scam. Granny reveals herself to the pair and threatens to expose their scam to Jed, and thus the impending wedding will be off. But before she can do so, they capture her, restrain her, and have her institutionalized at the Los Viejos Nursing Home, so that she cannot contact Jed.

At the wedding, Woodrow prepares to transfer all of Clampett's money in Drysdale's bank to a Swiss account, on his laptop computer, when the couple says 'I do'. Realizing that Granny is missing, Jane goes to the office of Barnaby Jones (Buddy Ebsen) and after learning where Granny is and who Laura is, poses as a nurse and breaks her out. Granny and Jane arrive at the wedding and foil Laura and Tyler's plan when Jane grabs a shotgun and blows the laptop to bits, before they can steal Jed's money. The police arrest Laura and Woodrow. Jed decides that, since the wedding was off, they should have 'one hellacious shindig'.

Cast
 Jim Varney as Jedidiah D. 'Jed' Clampett, the patriarch of the Clampett family, Pearl's brother, Jethro and Jethrine's uncle, and Granny's son-in-law.
 Diedrich Bader as Jethro Bodine, Jed's nephew, Pearl's son, and Elly May's cousin who accompanies his family to Beverly Hills.
 Diedrich Bader also portrays Jethrine Bodine, Jed's niece, Pearl's daughter, Jethro's twin sister, and Elly May's other cousin.
 Erika Eleniak as Elly May Clampett, Jed's tomboy and animal-loving daughter, Pearl's niece, and Jethro and Jethrine's cousin.
 Cloris Leachman as Daisy May "Granny" Moses, Jed's mother-in-law and Elly May's maternal grandmother.
 Dabney Coleman as Milburn Drysdale, the CEO of the Commerce Bank of Beverly Hills, Margaret's husband, and Morgan's father.
 Lily Tomlin as Jane Hathaway, the secretary of Milburn who falls for Jethro.
 Rob Schneider as Woodrow Tyler, a banker at Commerce Bank who conspires to steal the Clampett's fortune.
 Lea Thompson as Laura Jackson, a con artist and girlfriend of Woodrow who poses as a French etiquette teacher named "Laurette Voleur".
 Penny Fuller as Margaret Drysdale, Milburn's wife and Morgan's mother.
 Kevin Connolly as Morgan Drysdale, Milburn and Margaret's son who develops a liking for Elly May.
 Linda Carlson as Pearl Bodine, Jed's sister, Jethro and Jethrine's mother, and Elly May's aunt.
 Buddy Ebsen as Barnaby Jones, a detective Jane enlists to help find Granny.
 Leann Hunley as Miss Arlington.
 Robert Easton as Mayor Jasper, the Mayor of Beverly Hills.
 Dolly Parton as Herself.
 Zsa Zsa Gabor as Herself.

The Dolly Parton 'band' was composed of members of Rhino Bucket (who had contributed a song on the soundtrack of the 1992 movie Wayne's World, also directed by Penelope Spheeris), the Dwight Yoakam Band (Skip Edwards), and Vern Monnett (Randy Meisner, Texas Tornados and Gary Allan). Parton's appearance reunited her with 9 to 5 co-stars Lily Tomlin and Dabney Coleman.

Release
In its first weekend, The Beverly Hillbillies grossed $9,525,375 at the US box office. The film moved up to number one the following week. It grossed $40 million in the United and States and Canada and $57.4 million worldwide.

Reception
On Rotten Tomatoes, the film has an approval rating of 24% based on reviews from 33 critics. The site's consensus states: "Wasting a talented cast and director Penelope Spheeris' deft comedic touch on crude hijinks, this lame adaptation digs for comedic gold and only finds dirt". On Metacritic the film has a score of 37 out of 100 based on reviews from 24 critics, indicating "generally unfavorable reviews". Audiences surveyed by CinemaScore gave the film a grade of 'B+' on scale of A+ to F.

Roger Ebert of the Chicago Sun-Times, gave the film half a star out of a possible 4, arguing that it did not capture the appeal of the original television series nor did it improve the source material:  Peter Travers of Rolling Stone, wrote: 
Owen Gleiberman of Entertainment Weekly, gave the film a grade 'D' and wrote: "The plot, which features Lea Thompson as a gold digger scheming to marry Jed, is like something you'd catch on the USA Network at 4 a.m. But enough of beating a dead possum. After sitting through The Beverly Hillbillies, I now realize that the best tribute anyone can make to the pop detritus of our childhood is to let it rest in peace".

Video game
In 1993, Synergistic Software developed and Capstone Software published a game for MS-DOS loosely based on the film. The game is a point-and-click adventure game.

References

External links

 
 
 

1993 comedy films
1993 films
American coming-of-age films
American slapstick comedy films
Country music films
Films set in Los Angeles
Films based on television series
Films directed by Penelope Spheeris
The Beverly Hillbillies
20th Century Fox films
Films set in Beverly Hills, California
Films scored by Lalo Schifrin
Films produced by Ian Bryce
1990s English-language films
1990s American films
Films about hillbillies